Vladimir Prokofyev (born ) is a Kazakhstani male volleyball player. He is part of the Kazakhstan men's national volleyball team. On club level he plays for Kondensat-Zhaikmunay.

References

External links
 profile at FIVB.org

1993 births
Living people
Kazakhstani men's volleyball players
Place of birth missing (living people)